The knockout stage of the EuroBasket 2011 took place between 14 to 18 September 2011. All matches were played at the Žalgiris Arena at Kaunas. The top four teams from both second round groups played a knockout-system to the final.

Bracket

5th place bracket

Quarterfinals

Spain vs. Slovenia

Macedonia vs. Lithuania

France vs. Greece

Russia vs. Serbia

Classification 5–8

Slovenia vs. Lithuania

Greece vs. Serbia

Semifinals

Spain vs. Macedonia

France vs. Russia

Seventh place game

Slovenia vs. Serbia

Fifth place game

Lithuania vs. Greece

Bronze medal game

Macedonia vs. Russia

Final

Spain vs. France

External links
Fixtures

FIBA EuroBasket 2011
2011–12 in Slovenian basketball
2011–12 in Spanish basketball
2011–12 in Republic of Macedonia basketball
2011–12 in French basketball
2011–12 in Greek basketball
2011–12 in Russian basketball
2011–12 in Serbian basketball
Sport in Kaunas